María Pérez (born 20 July 1962) is a Venezuelan former swimmer. She competed in three events at the 1976 Summer Olympics.

References

1962 births
Living people
Venezuelan female swimmers
Olympic swimmers of Venezuela
Swimmers at the 1976 Summer Olympics
Pan American Games competitors for Venezuela
Swimmers at the 1979 Pan American Games
Place of birth missing (living people)
20th-century Venezuelan women